South sinai regional development programme (SSRDP) is an integrated regional development programme in the Governorate of South Sinai, Egypt and is funded by the European Union for the protection of cultural and natural resources, and enhancing the living conditions of local communities, particularly Bedouins.

The programme manages a grants totalling to € 54 million and is divided into two components:

Component I: pre-determined large projects related to infrastructure, studies, and equipment at a total of € 34 million. Most of the projects were identified in a large stakeholders conference in Sharm el Sheikh during 2004 and fine-tuned afterwards.

Component II: demand-driven Grant Scheme at total of € 20 million.

Component II (the grant scheme)
Arguably, the most visible division of the Programme because of its engaging the local communities and active players in South Sinai. It's divided to two schemes: Call for Proposal Number 1 and Direct Grants to Bedouin Communities.

The First Call for Proposals (with a total budget of € 19 million) has received 835 proposals (requesting € 297 million) and was open to NGOs, Government entities, and SMEs (most representative of local communities), and international organizations.

Component II also includes a direct grant of €1 million that will be targeting Bedouin communities. The Direct Grants procedure is intentionally simplified and designed with themes to suit local communities.

Objectives of the programme and priority issues for 2006 - 2010
The overall purpose of the programme is defined as the development of local economy and activities and the preservation and support of the social, cultural and natural resources of South Sinai.

The expected results are:
• the promotion of local communities (particularly Bedouins) and their social and economic development,
• the increased support for sustainable tourism development through a more balanced geographical distribution and diversification of activities, as well as the preservation and promotion of the unique cultural heritage of the region and its Bedouin population,
• the more effective decentralized environmental management and control in Protectorates, municipalities and tourist facilities,
• the improved delivery of appropriate social and public services to the Governorate’s urban, rural and clustered populations, with increased employment opportunities for local communities and in particular for the under-privileged and women,
• the strengthening of the decentralization process in decision making, financing and implementation,

The Grant Scheme Programme has two complementary and mutually supportive objectives:

1.	to maintain and advance the development of local economy through activities respectful of, and consistent with, the need to protect and preserve the sensitive and rich social, cultural and natural resources of South Sinai, particularly in the interest of the Bedouin population ; and
2.	to stimulate, encourage, promote, and support the interest, drive, initiative, and entrepreneurial spirit of local communities, particularly Bedouin and migrant workers, through their participation in such activities.

External links
 Official Website of the South Sinai Regional Development Programme(SSRDP)
 SSRDP Guidelines for Applicants, Call for Proposal Number 1
 View SSRDP on google maps

Sinai Peninsula